Prince Daniel (born 1973) is the husband of Crown Princess Victoria of Sweden.

Prince Daniel may also refer to:
 Daniel of Galicia (1201–1264), prince of Galicia 1205–1255
 Daniel of Moscow (1261–1303), Russian prince, son of Alexander Nevsky
 Prince Daniel of Saxony (born 1975)

See also
 Prince Daniyal (1572–1605), Prince of Mughal Empire and son of Emperor Akbar the Great
 Daniyal, son of Alauddin Husain Shah (r. 1494–1519), Sultan of Bengal